Bhesa nitidissima is a species of plant in the Centroplacaceae family. It is endemic to Sri Lanka.

Description
A tree with an average height of 20-30 meters (65-98 feet) but can reach as high as 50 meters (164 feet). Bark is usually dark brown and deeply cracked on older specimens. The unique feature of the Bhesa genus within the Centroplacaceae family is its geniculate petioles; which essentially means that the leaf bends sharply away from the stalk. The petiole usually contains three vascular bundles. Seed germination is epigeal. Produces 3-4mm wide, greenish to white sessile flowers with 5 petals. The flowers produce greenish brown, oblong seeds encased in a thick gelatinous aril inside capsules up to 2.2cm long.

Ecology
Endemic to Sri Lanka. Found mostly in low elevation wet zone forests, but have a recorded range of up to 1600 meters (5249 feet). The tree flowers September through October and produces fruit November through December. Although listed as critically endangered in 1998, a 2017 handbook of Sri Lankan flora suggests the tree is now quite common.

Uses
The arils of Bhesa are a known human food source. The tree is occasionally used for timber. Extracts from this genus are used in traditional medicine, to cure vomiting and diarrhea.

References

Flora of Sri Lanka
nitidissima
Critically endangered plants
Taxonomy articles created by Polbot